The following is a list of Belmont Bruins men's basketball head coaches. The Bruins have had 10 coaches in their 71-season history.

Belmont's current head coach is Casey Alexander. He was hired in April 2019 to replace Rick Byrd, who retired in 2019 after 33 years as the Bruins' head coach.

References

Belmont

Belmont Bruins men's basketball coaches